Cherasim Munteanu is a Romanian sprint canoer who competed in the 1970s. He won three medals at the ICF Canoe Sprint World Championships with two silvers (C-2 10000 m: 1973, 1979) and a bronze (C-2 1000 m: 1974).

References

Living people
Romanian male canoeists
Year of birth missing (living people)
ICF Canoe Sprint World Championships medalists in Canadian